is a Japanese idol, tarento and actress. She was born in Meguro, Tokyo as Naoko Niimura (新村 直子). Her mother is former actress Kyoko Saga.

Inoue's main claim to fame in the tarento circles is her bustline. She made her debut as a gravure idol in 2002 and went on to make several DVDs through 2006. Inoue also posed for annual calendars through 2010.

She also worked as a female guest announcer/interviewer for K-1 in 2006, after replacing Norika Fujiwara. Inoue remains active as an actress, appearing in numerous television commercials and programs, as well as on radio.

Roles
Inoue played herself in episode 488: The Devil of the TV Station, of the Detective Conan anime series.

References

External links
 Waka Inoue official page 
 Waka's feeling Official blog 

1980 births
Living people
Japanese gravure models
Japanese actresses
Japanese television personalities
Kickboxing commentators
People from Meguro